The Freedoms Foundation is an American non-profit, non-partisan, non-sectarian educational organization, founded in 1949. The foundation is located adjacent to the Valley Forge National Historical Park, near Valley Forge, Pennsylvania.

Bill of Responsibilities
In 1985, the foundation developed a "Bill of Responsibilities" as part of its worldwide educational efforts. It was meant to be a corollary to the Bill of Rights.

Awards program
The foundation honors Americans who set examples in responsible citizenship, free enterprise education, and long-term civic accomplishment.

Medal of Honor Grove
As part of its mission to promote responsible citizenship, character and freedom, the foundation maintains a grove dedicated to recipients of the Medal of Honor, the nation's highest award for valor. The Medal of Honor Grove consists of forty-two acres of woodland. Within the grove, each area is dedicated to one of the fifty states, the District of Columbia, or the Commonwealth of Puerto Rico. Each acre contains an obelisk that features a dedication plaque, plus the seal of that state, the District of Columbia, or Puerto Rico, plus a list of Medal of Honor recipients from that state, D.C., or Puerto Rico. In most cases, a tree has been planted for each recipient, along with a tree marker that contains the name, rank, unit, and date and place of action for the recipient. "America's Walk of Honor" was dedicated in April 1997, to allow visitors an opportunity to walk the grounds of the Medal of Honor Grove. American artist Peter Max designed the first stone on the Walk of Honor.

At the foundation are ninety volumes of research on Medal of Honor recipients, including photographs, sketches, biographies, and handwritten citations.

The grove is supported by the Friends of the Medal of Honor Grove, a nonprofit organization which seeks to maintain and upgrade the fifty-two acres of the woodland park, in honor of Medal of Honor recipients.

Gallery

Involvement with the Boy Scouts of America

Since 1949, Freedoms Foundation and the Boy Scouts of America have worked together, including with the creation of the "Price of Freedom" conference, a four-day residential program where participants interact with experts on current issues of citizenship, patriotism, leadership, and heroism.

References

External links 
Freedoms Foundation at Valley Forge

Valley Forge
Non-profit organizations based in Pennsylvania
Organizations established in 1949
1949 establishments in Pennsylvania